The siege of Multan began in March 1818 and lasted until 2 June 1818 as part of the Afghan–Sikh Wars, and saw the Sikh Empire capture the city of Multan (in modern-day Pakistan) from the Durrani Empire.

Background 

Maharaja Ranjit Singh had previously invaded Multan seven times successfully. He first led the invasion in 1802 which ended with Nawab Muzaffar Khan offering his submission, some presents and a promise to pay tribute. Ranjit Singh led the second invasion in 1805 which resulted with Nawab Muzaffar Khan again offering him rich presents and a tribute of 70,000 rupees. Third invasion in 1807 happened when Ahmad Khan Sial who fled to Jhang during Ranjit Singh's invasion of Multan in 1805, persuaded Nawab Muzaffar Khan to organise a tough resistance against Ranjit Singh, noting that Ranjit Singh was busy with Holkar-Lake incident. Ranjit Singh advanced and besieged Multan but the siege was raised after Nawab yielded, paying some tribute and gifting 5 horses. Fourth invasion in 1810 led due to Muzaffar Khan's refusal to pay tribute where Ranjit Singh captured the city and sieged the fort. After a hard fought battle from both sides for 2 months, Muzaffar Khan was defeated and submitted to paying tribute of 1,80,000 rupees along with 20 horses and a promise to pay annual tribute to Ranjit Singh. Fifth invasion occurred in 1812 but ended peacefully with successful negotiation of tribute. The sixth invasion in 1815 led due to the annual tribute from Multan falling past due, resulting with a siege where the Sikhs scaled the walls of the fort, leading to Muzaffar Khan's submission and paying 200,000 rupees. In 1816, Nawab realized tribute after brief resistance and continued to realize tribute the following year, but in August 1817, news of Nawab extorting money from the people of Multan resulting in their hardship, reached Lahore. Tired of demands of tributes, Nawab Muzaffar Khan decided to militarily resist by putting the fort in a state of defence after repairing the fort and mounting guns and gathering resources, and this led to Ranjit Singh's final conquest of Multan in 1818, resulting in the capture and fall of the city, bringing the territory under the complete domain of Sikh Empire with the appointment of Sukh Dayal Khatri as the governor of Multan followed with Sham Singh Peshauriya.

Battle 
In early 1818, Ranjit Singh ordered Misr Diwan Chand to rendezvous on the south-west frontier of the Sikh Empire to make preparations for an expedition against Multan. By January 1818, the Sikh Empire had established an extensive supply chain from the capital, Lahore, to Multan, with the use of boat transports to ferry supplies across the Jhelum, Chenab, and Ravi rivers. Rani Raj Kaur (Mai Nakkain) was given the command  of the of food and ammunition supply additionally she, herself oversaw the steady supply of grain, horses, and ammunition being sent to the at Kot Kamalia, a town equally distanced between Multan and Lahore.

In early January Misr Diwan Chand began their campaign with the capture of Nawab Muzaffar Khan's forts at Muzaffargarh and Khangarh. In February, the Sikh force under actual command of Misr Diwan Chand and nominial under Kharak Singh reached Multan and ordered Muzaffar to pay the large tribute he owed and to surrender the fort, but Muzaffar refused. The Sikh forces under Misr Diwan Chand won an engagement near the city but were unable to capture Muzaffar before he retreated into the fort. The Sikh army asked for more artillery and Ranjit Singh sent them the Zamzama and other large artillery pieces, which commenced fire on the walls of the fort. Muzaffar and his sons attempted a sortie to defend the fort but were killed in the battle.
The siege of Multan ended significant Afghan influence in the Peshawar region and led to the capture of Peshawar by the Sikhs.

Aftermath
Sardars who had participated in this campaign were given inams and jagirs. ' Misr Diwan Chand, the main conqueror of Multan, was awarded the title of Zafar-Jang-Bahadur (the victorious in battle), and was also given a jagir worth 25,000 rupees and a khillat of the value of one lakh rupees.

Notes

See also 

 Siege of Multan

References

Bibliography 

Conflicts in 1818
1818 in India
History of Multan
Battles involving the Sikhs
March 1818 events